Eulima raymondi is a species of sea snail, a marine gastropod mollusk in the family Eulimidae.

References

External links
 To World Register of Marine Species

raymondi
Gastropods described in 1904